The Slovak National Time Trial Championships have been held since 1993.

Men

Women

See also
Slovak National Road Race Championships
National Road Cycling Championships

References

National road cycling championships
Cycle races in Slovakia
Recurring sporting events established in 1993
1993 establishments in Slovakia